Donald Joseph Ecker (born March 9, 1986) is an American professional baseball coach. He is the bench coach and offensive coordinator for the Texas Rangers of Major League Baseball (MLB). He played college baseball for California State University, Long Beach and Lewis–Clark State College. The Texas Rangers selected Ecker in the 22nd round of the 2007 MLB draft. He has coached in MLB for the Cincinnati Reds and the San Francisco Giants.

Playing career
Ecker graduated from Los Altos High School in Los Altos, California, in 2004. He played baseball and football at Los Altos, and received an athletic scholarship to the University of Nevada for football. The Cincinnati Reds of Major League Baseball (MLB) selected him in the 28th round of the 2004 MLB draft. Though Ecker did not sign with the Reds, he opted to focus on baseball.

He enrolled at California State University, Long Beach and played college baseball for the Long Beach State Dirtbags as a freshman, for whom he was 2-for-12 with a double in 2006. He transferred to Lewis–Clark State College in Idaho and  continued his college career for the Lewis–Clark State Warriors, for whom he was 1-for-7 in 2007.

The Texas Rangers selected Ecker in the 22nd round of the 2007 MLB draft. He played in the Rangers organization in 2007 and 2008, batting .268/.360/.371 in 97 at bats for the Rookie-level AZL Rangers and the Class A Short-Season Spokane Indians. He then played in the Frontier League, an independent baseball league, batting .291/.391/.401 in 172 at bats in 2010 in Illinois for the Windy City Thunderbolts and the Gateway Grizzlies. He retired as a player prior to the 2011 season.

Coaching career
He coached baseball at Los Altos High School, first as an assistant for two years, and then as coach for two years from 2013-14. Bakersfield College hired him as an assistant coach in 2014.

In 2015, the St. Louis Cardinals of MLB hired Ecker to work in player development, a position he held for three years. In 2015 and 2016  he was the hitting coach for the Class High-A Palm Beach Cardinals, and he was then the hitting coach at Class A Advanced Peoria Chiefs in 2017.

In 2018 Ecker was the hitting coach for the Los Angeles Angels' Triple-A affiliate the Salt Lake Bees.

The Cincinnati Reds hired Ecker as their assistant hitting coach in November 2018. The Reds added the title director of hitting to Ecker's responsibilities following the 2019 season.

The San Francisco Giants hired Ecker as one of their two major league hitting coaches prior to the 2020 season. The Texas Rangers hired Ecker as their bench coach and offensive coordinator on November 1, 2021.

References

External links

Cincinnati Reds coaching bio

    

1986 births
Living people
Baseball players from Bakersfield, California
Baseball infielders
Arizona League Rangers players
Spokane Indians players
San Angelo Colts players
Windy City ThunderBolts players
Gateway Grizzlies players
High school baseball coaches in the United States
Minor league baseball coaches
Cincinnati Reds coaches
San Francisco Giants coaches
Texas Rangers coaches
Major League Baseball bench coaches
Major League Baseball hitting coaches
Long Beach State Dirtbags baseball players
Lewis–Clark State Warriors baseball players
Bakersfield Renegades baseball coaches